The Carroll's International was a  professional golf tournament played in the Republic of Ireland from 1963 to 1974. It was part of the British PGA tournament circuit, which evolved into the European Tour, and as such is recognised as an official European Tour event from 1972.

The tournament was founded by sponsors Carroll's in 1963, as a successor to the Irish Hospitals Tournament which had been held at Woodbrook Golf Club from 1958 to 1962.  For the first two years, the Carroll's tournament was also played at Woodbrook and titled as the Carroll Sweet Afton tournament. It was played at Cork Golf Club in 1965 and The Royal Dublin Golf Club in 1966, before returning to Woodbrook where it remained until its final edition in 1974. The Carroll's International ended due to Carroll's becoming the title sponsor of the revived Irish Open in 1975; the Carroll's Irish Open was held at Woodbrook in its first year.

In 1966, at Royal Dublin, Christy O'Connor Snr finished 2-3-3 (eagle-birdie-eagle) to win the tournament by 2 strokes. At the par-4 16th he drove the green and holed a 20-foot putt. He then holed a 12-foot putt at the 17th and, at the par-5 18th, hit a 3-iron to 8 feet and holed the putt. A plaque by the 16th tee commemorates the achievement.

Winners

See also
Carroll's Number 1 Tournament
Carroll's Irish Match Play Championship

Notes

References

External links
Coverage on the European Tour's official site

Former European Tour events
Golf tournaments in the Republic of Ireland
Golf in County Dublin
1963 establishments in Ireland
1974 disestablishments in Ireland
Recurring sporting events established in 1963
Recurring sporting events disestablished in 1974